Suriname or Surinam may refer to:

 Suriname, a nation in South America (independent 1975-present)
 Suriname River, a river within the same nation
 Suriname (district), a former district within the nation
 Surinam (English colony), (1650-1667)
 Surinam (Dutch colony), (1667–1954)
 Suriname (Kingdom of the Netherlands), constituent country (1954–1975)

See also